Ambrosov (masculine) or Ambrosova (feminine) is a Russian last name, a variant of Abrosimov.

See also
Zuzana Ambrošová, piano player performing a piece by Sylvie Bodorová, Czech composer
Ambrosovo, a rural locality (a village) in Yuryevetsky District of Ivanovo Oblast, Russia

References

Notes

Sources
И. М. Ганжина (I. M. Ganzhina). "Словарь современных русских фамилий" (Dictionary of Modern Russian Last Names). Москва, 2001. 



Russian-language surnames
Patronymic surnames
Surnames from given names